is a Japanese musician affiliated with Music Ray'n and signed to Sacra Music. She was the opening act for the Chico with HoneyWorks 2017 tour. In 2018, she released her first single "Kimi no Tonari", the title track of which was used as the closing theme for the anime series Wotakoi: Love is Hard for Otaku. Her music has been featured in Ace Attorney, Rent-A-Girlfriend, and Kaguya-sama: Love Is War.

Biography
Halca had an interest in music from early childhood. She was inspired when she received a CD copy of the song "Again" by Yui. While in junior high school, she became familiar with anime music when she discovered that her home's cable TV had an anime channel, which she would then watch on a daily basis. Although series such as Cardcaptor Sakura and Toradora!  left an impact on her, it was "Kiss Kara Hajimaru Miracle" from Steel Angel Kurumi that became her favorite anime song. She joined her school's choir club and broadcast theater club to hone her vocal skills.

After deciding to pursue a career as a musician, Halca considered various singing auditions. After discovering Utakatsu! Audition, which focused on anime songs, she decided to participate in it; she won the grand prize in 2013. After winning the audition, she continued training while waiting to make her major debut. In 2017 she was invited by the singer Chico, known for her involvement with the music group HoneyWorks, to participate in the latter's live tour as their opening act. Following this, she performed the song , which was included in a compilation album released to celebrate the 10th anniversary of the online novel publisher Noichigo. She also performed the song "Resonator", which was used in the soundtrack of the anime series Beatless, and made a mini-album titled White Disc, which was sold at the Honeyworks tour.

Halca made her major debut in 2018 with the release of her first single ; the title track of which was used as the closing theme for the anime series Wotakoi: Love is Hard for Otaku. To commemorate the release of the single, White Disc was made available for sale during the single's release event. Her second single  was released in October 2018, with the title track being used as the closing theme for the second season of the Ace Attorney anime television series. Her third single  was released in February 2019; the title track is used as the closing theme for the anime series Kaguya-sama: Love is War. Her fourth single  was released on November 13, 2019; the title track is used as the closing theme to the second season of We Never Learn. Her fifth single  was released in September 2020; the title track is used as the closing theme for the anime series Rent-A-Girlfriend. Her sixth single  was released on May 19, 2021; the title track is used as a closing theme for the anime series Boruto: Naruto Next Generations.

Discography

Singles

References

External links
  
 

21st-century Japanese singers
Anime musicians
Japanese pop musicians
Living people
Sacra Music artists
Year of birth missing (living people)
21st-century Japanese women singers